Narthaki is a village and a former municipality in the Larissa regiona unit, Thessaly, Greece. Since the 2011 local government reform it is part of the municipality Farsala, of which it is a municipal unit. Population 1,175 (2011). The municipal unit has an area of 164.101 km2.

References

Populated places in Larissa (regional unit)